Lieutenant General Amir Abdullah Khan Niazi  (1915 – 1 February 2004) was a Pakistan Army general. During the Bangladesh Liberation War and the Indo-Pakistani War of 1971, he commanded the Pakistani Eastern Command in East Pakistan (now Bangladesh), he signed the instrument of surrender as in 16 Dec. '71 his forces had to surrender to the Indian Army's Eastern Command's commander Lieutenant General Jagjit Singh Aurora by the order of the then President of Pakistan Yahya Khan.

Niazi's area of responsibility comprised the defense of East Pakistan from India during the war in 1971, and authors and critics within the Pakistani military held him morally responsible for his decision to unilaterally surrender the Pakistani Eastern Command, which resulted in the war's end in a decisive Indian victory as well as the independence of Bangladesh.

After being taken and held as a prisoner of war by the Indian military, he was repatriated to Pakistan on 30 April 1975 as part of the Delhi Agreement. He was dishonourably discharged from his military service at the War Enquiry Commission led by Hamoodur Rahman. The Commission leveled accusations against him for human rights violations in East Pakistan and the supervision of smuggling efforts during the Bangladesh Liberation War; he was held responsible for Pakistan's military failure during the course of the conflict. Niazi, however, rejected these allegations and sought a military court-martial while insisting that he had acted according to the orders of the Pakistan Army GHQ in Rawalpindi; the court-martial was never granted.

After the war, he remained active in Pakistani politics and supported an ultra-conservative agenda under the Pakistan National Alliance against the government of Zulfiqar Ali Bhutto in the 1970s.

In 1999, he authored the book Betrayal of East Pakistan, in which he provided his "own true version of the events of that fateful year". Niazi died in Lahore, Punjab, Pakistan, on 1 February 2004.

Biography

Early life and British Indian Army career

Khan was born in Mianwali, British India, in 1915, into a mixed Punjabi and Pashtun family. His village, Balo Khel, is located on the eastern bank of the Indus River. After matriculating from a local high-school in Mianwali, he joined the British Indian Army as an "Y cadet" in 1941 as he was selected for an emergency commission in the army.

He received training in Officers Training School, Bangalore and Fatehgarh's Rajput Regiment's training centre; he was commissioned as an Emergency Commissioned Officer (ECO) in the rank of second lieutenant during the World War II on 8 March 1942 (following a 6 months training) into the 4/7 Rajput Regiment (4th Battalion of the 7th Rajput Regiment) which was then a part of the 161st Indian Infantry Brigade led by Brigadier D.F.W. Warren.

World War II and Burma campaigns

On 11 June 1942, Lt. Niazi was stationed in the Kekrim Hills located in regions of Assam-Manipur to participate in the Burma front. That spring, he was part of the 14th Army of the British Indian Army commanded by General William Slim.

During this period, the 14th Army had halted the offense against the Imperial Japanese Army at the Battle of Imphal and elsewhere in bitterly fought battles along the Burma front. His valor of actions were commendable and General Slim described his gallantry in a lengthy report to General Headquarters, India, about his judgment of the best course of action. They agreed on Niazi's skill in completely surprising the enemy, his leadership, coolness under fire, and his ability to change tactics, create diversions, extricate his wounded men. At the Burma front in 1944, Lt. Niazi impressed his superior officers when he commanded a platoon that initiated an offence against the Imperial Japanese Army at the Bauthi-Daung tunnels.

Lt. Niazi's gallantry had impressed his British commanders in the GHQ India and they wanted to award him the Distinguished Service Order, but his rank was not high enough for such a decoration. During the campaign, Brigadier D.F.W. Warren, commander of the 161st Indian Infantry Brigade of the British Army, gave Niazi the soubriquet "Tiger" for his part in a ferocious fight with the Japanese. After the conflict, the British Government decorated Lt. Niazi with the Military Cross for leadership, judgement, quick thinking and calmness under pressure in action along the border with Burma.

On 15 December 1944, Lord Wavell, Viceroy of India, flew to Imphal and knighted General Slim and his corps commanders Stopford, Scoones, and Christison in the presence of Lord Mountbatten. Only two British Indian Army officers were chosen to be decorated at that ceremony— one was Lt. Niazi and the other was Major Sam Manekshaw of the Frontier Force Regiment.

After the end of World War II, in 1945, from an Emergency Commissioned Officer, Niazi was granted a regular commission of the British Indian Army, and he got his service number as IC0-906 (Indian Commissioned Officer-906);  he was promoted as captain and sent to attend the Command and Staff College in Quetta which he graduated with a staff course degree under then-Lt. Col. Yahya Khan.

Pakistan Army: from major to lieutenant general

In 1947 the United Kingdom, through the Indian Independence Act 1947, announced their intention of partitioning British India amid the failure of the 1946 Cabinet Mission to India. After the creation of Pakistan in August 1947, Major Niazi decided to opt for Pakistani citizenship and joined the newly established Pakistan Army where his S/No was redesigned as PA–477 by the Ministry of Defence of Pakistan and he joined the Punjab Regiment. He continued serving at the Command and Staff College in Quetta and briefly completed his tenure as an instructor.

His career in the army progressed well. In the rank of Lt. Col. he served as commanding officer of two battalions in West Pakistan and one in East Pakistan. In 1961, he was promoted as Brigadier and offered discussion on infiltration tactics at the Command and Staff College. Subsequently, he published an article on infiltration and promoted talks on military-supported local rebellion against the enemy. He served as the commander of 51st Infantry Brigade in Karachi and was decorated with the Sitara-i-Khidmat (lit. Service Star) for his contributions and service with the army. His leadership credentials had led him to be appointed martial law administrator of both Karachi and Lahore to maintain control of law in the cities of West Pakistan during this time. Shortly after, he was appointed as the commandant of School of Infantry and Tactics in Quetta.

Brigadier Niazi went on to participate in the Indo-Pakistani War of 1965, the second war with India. He was appointed as the commander of 14th Paratroopers Brigade under 7th Infantry Division (then commanded by Maj. Gen. Yahya Khan), which later became part of the 12th Infantry Division under Maj. Gen. Akhtar Hussain Malik; Niazi commanded the 1st Infantry Brigade in Azad Kashmir for a brief period but later was reappointed as the commander of 14th Para Brigade in Zafarwal sector, he gained public notability when he participated in the famous Battle of Chawinda tank battle against the Indian Army which halted the Indians troops rotation. His role in a tank battle led him to be decorated with the Hilal-e-Jurat by the President of Pakistan. After the war he was again took command of the School of Infantry and Tactics.

On 18 October 1966, he was promoted as Major-General and made General Officer Commanding (GOC) of the 8th Infantry Division, stationed in Sialkot, Punjab, Pakistan. On 22 June 1969, Major-General Niazi was made GOC of 10th Infantry Division, stationed in Lahore, Punjab, Pakistan. On 2 April 1971, he was promoted to Lieutenant General, and his initial appointment in this rank was the commander of IV Corps, though he never took command of this corps as his appointment was immediately changed and he was to take command of the Eastern Command in East Pakistan.

East Pakistan

Eastern Command in 1971 war

Lieutenant-General Niazi volunteered for transfer to East Pakistan when Lieutenant-General Bahadur Sher Khan declined the post. There were two other generals who had also refused postings in the East. However, Niazi said "yes" without necessarily realizing the risks involved and how to counter them.

After General Tikka Khan had initiated the Operation Searchlight military crackdown in March 1971, many officers had declined to be stationed in the East and Niazi arrived in Dhaka on 4 April 1971 to assume the Eastern Command from Tikka Khan. Furthermore, the mass killing of Bengali intellectuals in 1971 at the University of Dhaka had made the East Pakistani people hostile towards the Pakistani military, which made it hard for Niazi to overcome the situation. On 10/11 April 1971, he headed a meeting of his senior commanders to assess the situation but, according to eyewitnesses, he used abusive language aimed at the Bengali rebels. From May through August 1971, the Indian Army trained Mukti Bahini led Operation Jackpot, a series of counter guerrilla campaigns against the Eastern Command, and Niazi began taking countermeasures against the Bengali rebellion. By June 1971, he sent reports on the rebellion and noted that 30,000 insurgents were hurriedly trained by India at the India-East Pakistan border. In August 1971, Niazi formulated a plan to defend the borders from the advancing Indian Army based on a "fortress concept" which mean converting the border towns and villages into a stronghold.

By September 1971, he was appointed the martial law administrator in order to provide his support to Governor Abdul Motaleb Malik who appointed a civilian cabinet. On the issue of the 1971 East Pakistan genocide, Niazi had reportedly told his public relations officer and press secretary, Major Siddique Salik, that "we will have to account every single rape and killing when back in (West) Pakistan. God never spares the Tyrant."

The Government of East Pakistan appointed Niazi as commander of the Eastern Command, and Major-General Rao Farman Ali as their military adviser for the East Pakistan Rifles and Pakistan Marines. In October 1971, he created and deployed two ad hoc divisions to strengthen the defence of the East from further infiltration.

In November 1971, General Abdul Hamid Khan, the Chief of Staff, warned him of an imminent Indian attack on the East and advised him to redeploy the Eastern Command on a tactical and political base ground but this was not implemented due to shortage of time. In a public message, Niazi was praised by Abdul Hamid Khan saying: "The whole nation is proud of you and you have their full support".

No further orders or clarification was issued in regards to the orders as Niazi had been caught unawares when the Indian Army planned to launch a full assault on East Pakistan. On 3 December 1971, the Pakistan Air Force (PAF) launched Operation Chengiz Khan, the pre-emptive PAF air-strikes on Indian Air Force bases that officially led to start of the Indo-Pakistani War of 1971, the third war with India. According to Krishna Chandra Sagar, Niazi was surprisingly not aware of the attack and had no prior knowledge of the attack.

Credibility of this claim is given by Niazi's press secretary and public relations officer, then-Major Siddique Salik, who wrote in Witness to Surrender, that Niazi's chief of staff Brigadier Baqir Siddiqi reportedly scolded him of not notifying Niazi and his staff of an aerial attack on India.

Surrendering of Eastern Command

When Indian Army soldiers crossed the borders and charged towards Dhaka, General Niazi panicked when he came to realise the real nature of the Indian strategy and became frantically nervous when the Indian Army successfully penetrated the defence of the East. Niazi's military staff further regretted not heeding the intelligence warnings issued 20 years earlier in the 1952 Cable 1971 report compiled by Major K. M. Arif, the military intelligence official on Niazi's staff.

According to the testimonies provided by Major-General Farman Ali in the War Enquiry Commission, Niazi's morale collapsed as early as 7 December and he cried frantically over the progress report presented to Governor Abdul Motaleb. Niazi ultimately blamed Lieutenant-General Tikka Khan for the army's oppressive strategy. Major accusations were also directed toward Lieutenant-General Yakob Ali Khan, Admiral S. M. Ahsan and Major-General Ali for aggravating the crisis, but Niazi had to bear most responsibility for all that happened in the East.

General Niazi, along with his deputy Rear-Admiral Mohammad Shariff, nervously tried reassessing the situation to halt the Indian Army's penetration by directing joint army-navy operations with no success. The Pakistani military combat units found themselves involved in a guerrilla war with the Mukti Bahini under Atul Osmani, and were unprepared and untrained for such warfare.

On 9 December, the Indian Government accepted the sovereignty of Bangladesh and extended its diplomatic mission to the Provisional Government of Bangladesh. This eventually led Governor Abdul Motaleb to resign from his post and he took refuge with his entire cabinet at the Red Cross shelter at the Inter-Continental Dacca on 14 December.

Niazi eventually took control of the civilian government and received a telegram on 16 December 1971 from President Yahya Khan: "You have fought a heroic battle against overwhelming odds. The nation is proud of you ... You have now reached a stage where further resistance is no longer humanly possible nor will it serve any useful purpose ... You should now take all necessary measures to stop the fighting and preserve the lives of armed forces personnel, all those from West Pakistan and all loyal elements".

During this time, the Special Branch of the East Pakistan Police notified Niazi of the joint Indo-Bengali siege of Dhaka as the Eastern Command led by Lieutenant-General Jagjit Singh Aurora began encircling Dhaka. Niazi then appealed for a conditional ceasefire to Lieutenant-General Jagjit Singh Aurora which called for transferring power to the elected government, but without the surrender of the Eastern Command led by Niazi. This offer was rejected by Indian Army's Chief of Army Staff General Sam Manekshaw and he set a deadline for surrender, President Yahya Khan considered it as "illegitimate.
 Niazi then once again appealed for a cease-fire, but Manekshaw set a deadline for surrender, failing which Dhaka would come under siege.

Subsequently, the Indian Army began encircling Dhaka and Lieutenant-General Jagjit Singh Aurora sent a message through Major-General Rafael Jacob that issued an ultimatum to surrender in a "30-minutes" time window on 16 December 1971. Niazi agreed to surrender and sent a message to Manekshaw despite many army officers declined to obey, although they were legally bound. The Indian Army commanders, Lieutenant General Sagat Singh, Lieutenant General J.S. Aurora, and Major-General Rafael Farj Jacob arrived at Dhaka via helicopter with the surrender documents.

The surrender took place at Ramna Race Course, in Dhaka at local time 16:31 on 16 December 1971. Niazi signed the Instrument of Surrender and handed over his personal weapon to J. S. Aurora in the presence of Indian and Bangladesh force commanders. With Niazi, nearly 90,000 personnel of the Eastern Command surrendered to the joint Indian and Bangladesh Army.

War prisoner, repatriation, and politics

Niazi, who was repatriated to Pakistan, was handed over to Lieutenant-General Abdul Hamid, then corps commander of the IV Corps, by Indian Army from the Wagha checkpoint in Lahore District, Punjab, in April 1975, in a symbolic gesture of the last war prisoner held by India. Upon arriving in Lahore, he immediately refrained from speaking to news media correspondents, and was immediately taken under the custody of the Pakistan Army's Military Police (MP) who shifted him via helicopter to Lahore Cantonment where he was detained despite his strong protests. He was immediately dismissed from his military commission and his war honours were withdrawn from him.

Subsequently, he was placed in solitary confinement for sometime, though he was later released. Being the last to return supported his reputation as a "soldier's general", but did not shield him from the scorn he faced in Pakistan, where he was blamed for the surrender. Bhutto discharged Niazi after stripping him of his military rank, the pension usually accorded to retired soldiers, and his military decorations. He was dismissed from the service in July 1975.

He was also denied his military pension and medical benefits, though he lodged a strong complaint against the revoking of his pension. In the 1980s, the Ministry of Defence quietly changed the status of "dismissal" to "retirement" but did not restore his rank. The change of order allowed Niazi to seek a pension and the medical assistance benefits enjoyed by retired military personnel.

Niazi remained active in national politics in 1970s and supported the ultraconservative agenda on a conservative Pakistan National Alliance platform against the Pakistan Peoples Party. In 1977, he was again detained by the police when the Operation Fair Play military coup occurred on 5 July, overthrowing the government of Prime Minister Zulfikar Ali Bhutto. Martial law was enforced and Niazi sought retirement from politics.

War Enquiry Commission

In 1982, Niazi was summoned and confessed to the War Enquiry Commission led by Chief Justice Hamoodur Rahman and the Supreme Court of Pakistan on the events involving the secession of East Pakistan in April 1975. The War Commission leveled accusations against him of several kinds of ethical misconduct during his tenure in East Pakistan. The Commission opined that Niazi supervised the betel leaf and imported paan using an official aircraft, from East Pakistan to Pakistan.

The Commission indicted him for corruption and moral turpitude while noting his bullying of junior officers who opposed his orders. Niazi tried placing the blame on the Yahya administration, his military adviser Maj. Gen. Farman Ali, Admiral S.M. Ahsan, Lieutenant-General Yakob Ali, and the military establishment. The Commission partially accepted his claims by critically noting that General Niazi was a Supreme Commander of the Eastern Command, and that he was responsible for everything that happened in the East." Though he showed no regrets, Niazi refused to accept responsibility for the Breakup of East Pakistan and squarely blamed President Yahya. The Commission endorsed his claims that Yahya was to blame, but noted that Niazi was the Commander who lost the East.

The Commission recommended a court-martial be held by the Judge Advocate General that would indict Niazi for serious breaches of military discipline and the military code. No such court-martial took place, but nonetheless, he was politically maligned and indicted with the war crimes that took place in East Pakistan. Niazi did not accept the Commission's inquiries and fact-findings, believing that the Commission had no understanding of military matters. Niazi claimed that a court-martial would have besmirched the names of those who later rose to great heights, and that he was being used as a scapegoat.

In 1998, he authored a book, The Betrayal of East Pakistan, which was a record of the events that led to 16 December 1971. In 2001, he appeared on Views On News, and was interviewed by Dr. Shahid Masood at ARY News shortly before his death.

Death and legacy

After giving an interview to ARY News, Niazi died on 1 February 2004 in Lahore, Punjab, Pakistan. He was buried in a Military Graveyard in Lahore.

Political commentators described Niazi's legacy as a mixture of the foolhardy, and the ruthless.

A journalist from the Dawn newspaper had observed him thus: "When I last met him on 30 September 1971, at his force headquarters in Kurmitola, he was full of beans".

From the mass of evidence coming before the War Enquiry Commission from witnesses, both civil and military, there is little doubt that Niazi came to acquire a bad reputation in sex matters, and this reputation has been consistent during his postings in Sialkot, Lahore and East Pakistan. The allegations regarding his indulgence in the export of Pan by using or abusing his position in the Eastern Command and as Commander of his command also prima facie appear to be well-founded.

Niazi in his book revealed that he was very depressed at the time of surrender and that he signed the instrument of surrender with a "very heavy heart".

Awards and decorations

Foreign Decorations

Notes

References

External links
 Pakistan: Independence and Military Succession
 Video of Surrender By General Niazi, A. A. K.
 Lt. Gen A.A.K. Niazi

|-

1915 births
2004 deaths
People from Mianwali District
British Indian Army officers
1971 Bangladesh genocide perpetrators
Recipients of the Military Cross
Bangladesh Liberation War
Generals of the Indo-Pakistani War of 1971
Generals of the Bangladesh Liberation War
Governors of East Pakistan